1983–1986 is an album of Polish new wave group Sni Sredstvom Za Uklanianie, released in 2008 by Biodro Records. It contains sixteen songs recorded in 1995. Sni Sredstvom Za Uklanianie was split up in 1988 but Tymon Tymański decided to reunite his band for two weeks only to record songs played live between 1983 and 1986. Songs were previously recorded in Gdańsk music studio SAR in 1986, but tapes with this material were irretrievably lost.

Track listing

Personnel
 Tymon Tymański – voice, guitar
 Piotr Merta – guitar
 Bartek Szmit – drums

References

2008 compilation albums
Sni Sredstvom Za Uklanianie compilation albums
Biodro Records compilation albums
Polish-language compilation albums